Cyathomone sodiroi is a species of flowering plant in the family Asteraceae, and the only member of the genus Cyathomone. It is found only in Ecuador, where it lives in subtropical or tropical moist montane forests, and it is threatened by habitat loss.

References

Coreopsideae
Monotypic Asteraceae genera
Flora of Ecuador
Data deficient plants
Taxonomy articles created by Polbot